Loudon Cumberland Presbyterian Church is a historic church of the Cumberland Presbyterian denomination, located on College Street in Loudon, Tennessee.

The congregation was established in Loudon in August 1853, although its official records begin in March 1855.

The church building, which was the congregation's third home, is a Carpenter Gothic design. The building was completed and dedicated in 1882. It was added to the National Register of Historic Places in 1982.

References

External links
 Loudon Cumberland Presbyterian Church

Presbyterian churches in Tennessee
Churches on the National Register of Historic Places in Tennessee
Carpenter Gothic church buildings in Tennessee
Churches completed in 1882
19th-century Presbyterian church buildings in the United States
Buildings and structures in Loudon County, Tennessee
Cumberland Presbyterian Church
National Register of Historic Places in Loudon County, Tennessee